Joachim Kaiser (18 December 1928 − 11 May 2017) was a German music, literature and theatre critic. From 1959 he worked as a senior editor in the feuilleton of the Süddeutsche Zeitung; from 1977 to 1996 he was professor of history of music at the State University of Music and Performing Arts Stuttgart.

Life 
Kaiser was born in Milken, East Prussia (Miłki, Poland) in 1928 as the son of a country doctor. Literature and music began to interest him at an early age, and at age eight he began to play the piano. After the flight and expulsion of Germans from Central and Eastern Europe 1945–1950, he attended the Wilhelm-Gymnasium (Hamburg). He then studied musicology, German studies, philosophy and sociology at the Georg-August-Universität Göttingen, the Johann Wolfgang Goethe-Universität Frankfurt am Main and the Eberhard Karls Universität Tübingen. Among his fellow students were the musicologists Carl Dahlhaus and Rudolf Stephan.

In June 1951 Kaiser began his journalistic career as a theatre, literature and music critic. His path was paved by a review of a publication by Theodor W. Adorno: Music and Catastrophe. About the "Philosophy of New Music". Adorno recommended to Kaiser Alfred Andersch of the Hessischer Rundfunk, which in turn drew the attention of the Frankfurter Hefte. Mathias Döpfner described him as "the best known and most successful Adorno students ever". At the invitation of Hans Werner Richter, Kaiser was allowed to take part in events of Group 47 from 1953. In 1958 he was awarded a doctorate in German Studies at the University of Tübingen on the subject of Franz Grillparzer's dramatic style. On the initiative of the then SZ journalist Erich Kuby, Kaiser was able to work in the cultural editorial department of the Süddeutsche Zeitung from 1959. He was a member of the writers' association PEN-Zentrum Deutschland.

Kaiser, along with Marcel Reich-Ranicki, was one of the most influential critics of Germany. His book Große Pianisten in unserer Zeit is occasionally referred to as the "Piano Michelin". Besides ground-breaking pianists such as Artur Rubinstein, Vladimir Horowitz, Glenn Gould, Sviatoslav Richter and Friedrich Gulda he introduced young interpreters and explained developments in the art of piano playing.

Kaiser felt a special connection to the work of Richard Wagner and supported and accompanied the new beginning of the Bayreuth Festival in 1951 under the direction of Wagner's grandchildren, Wieland and Wolfgang.

Kaiser was married to the translator and novelist Susanne Kaiser since December 1958, with whom he had two children: the director Henriette Kaiser  and the sports editor Philipp Kaiser. He lived in Munich on the edge of the Englischer Garten.

In 2009 he handed over his extensive private archive to the Deutsches Literaturarchiv Marbach as a Nachlass. Besides letters from Theodor W. Adorno and Alfred Andersch, it contains correspondence with Ingeborg Bachmann, Ernst Bloch and Heinrich Böll. From May 2009 onward, Kaiser answered readers' questions weekly in his video column Kaiser's Classic Customer on the website of SZ-Magazin. Due to an illness he had to give this up in January 2011. The series has not been continued since.

Kaiser died in Munich, aged 88.

Work 
 Kleines Theatertagebuch. Rowohlt, Reinbek 1965 (with preface: Kritik als Beruf).
 Große Pianisten in unserer Zeit. Piper Verlag, Munich 1965; New edition 1996, .
 Beethovens 32 Klaviersonaten und ihre Interpreten. S. Fischer, Frankfurt am Main 1975, .
 Erlebte Musik. Von Bach bis Stravinsky. Hoffmann und Campe, Hamburg 1977, .
 Erlebte Musik. Teil 2. Von Wagner bis Zimmermann. DTV, Munich 1982, .
 Mein Name ist Sarastro. Die Gestalten in Mozart's Meisteropern von Alfonso bis Zerlina. Piper, Munich 1984, .
 Wie ich sie sah … und wie sie waren – Zwölf kleine Porträts. List, Munich 1985, .
 Erlebte Literatur. Deutsche Schriftsteller in unserer Zeit. Piper, Munich 1988, .
 Leben mit Wagner. Knaus, Munich 1990; New edition: Siedler, Munich 2013, .
 „Vieles ist auf Erden zu thun.“ Imaginäre Gespräche (…). Piper, Munich 1991, .
 Was mir wichtig ist. Deutsche Verlags-Anstalt, Stuttgart 1996, .
 Kaisers Klassik. 100 Meisterwerke der Musik. Schneekluth, Munich 1997, .
 Kaisers Klassik. Da Capo. Schneekluth, Munich 1999, .
 Von Wagner bis Walser. Neues zu Literatur und Musik. Pendo, Zürich 1999, .
 "Ich bin der letzte Mohikaner". (autobiography, with Henriette Kaiser). Ullstein, Munich 2008, .

Catalogue of works
 Gesa Anssar, : Kaiser-Verzeichnis. Allitera, Munich 2003, .

Lecture series 
Kaiser's many years of lecturing activity at the Gasteig in Munich include his extensive series of lectures on specific artists and art forms, especially on the subject of music:
 About Ludwig van Beethoven in the 1970s; in Munich (Gymnasium Fürstenried, 60 lectures)
 About Mozart's operas; in the 1990s in Vaterstetten
 About Richard Wagner; i Munich Gasteig (Carl Orff-Hall), from 1989 to 11 May 1993 (63 lectures)
 About Symphony and Sonata between Beethoven, Brahms and Mahler
 The secret of great string quartet – Beethoven and Schubert as creators of classical chamber music works; at the Gasteig in Munich; the series was transferred to "The great late works", from 18 September 2007 to 16 November 2010.
From 11 October 1994 to 17 July 2007 Kaiser gave 206 lectures, a total of 322.

Radio series 
During weekly radio broadcasts (one hour long, for example "Kaisers Corner" in Bayern4-Klassik), he dealt with Chopin for half a year and with "Beethoven – Werk und Wirkung" for a whole year. In addition to this, there were regular word broadcasts, such as "Kaiser's Magazine Show".

Films 
 Der letzte Kaiser. TV-Feature, 2008, 5:25 Min., Buch: Peter Gerhardt, Produktion: Hessischer Rundfunk,  First broadcast: 16 November 2008.
 Musik im Fahrtwind. Dokumentarfilm, 2006, 87 Min., Written and directed by Henriette Kaiser, Production: Lemuel Film, First broadcast: 5 November 2006, Bayerischer Rundfunk
 Der Klassik-Kaiser. Dokumentarfilm, 1997, Buch und Regie: Eckhart Schmidt, Production: Raphaela Film GmbH
 In the film Bruckners Entscheidung (1995) by Jan Schmidt-Garre Kaiser played the role of Richard Wagner.

Awards 
 1966: Theodor Wolff Prize
 1993: Order of Merit of the Federal Republic of Germany 1. Class
 1993: Ludwig Börne Prize awarded for the first time 
 1997: 
 2001: Hildegard von Bingen Prize for Journalism
 2004:  for critics
 2009: 
 2010: Theodor-Wolff-Preis, for his life's work

References

External links 

 
 AudioVideo: Folge 10, über Bach bzw. Beethoven (Goldberg- bzw. Diabelli-Variationen) auf YouTube

Interviews
 "Ich weiß, dass ich sterben muss. Und zwar relativ bald". In Frankfurter Allgemeine Zeitung, 12 December 2008, Nr.50, Interview in nine little parts
 "Ich habe nichts gegen Dackel". In the Frankfurter Allgemeine Zeitung, 24 October 2005

Obituaries
 Langjähriger Feuilletonchef und SZ-Kritiker Joachim Kaiser ist tot. In the Süddeutsche Zeitung, 11 May 2017
 tagesspiegel.de: Meinungshäuptling der deutschen Kulturnation
 FAZ.net: Vom Genie eines ergriffenen Begreifers
 welt.de / Manuel Brug: Er war der Florist im Garten der Prosa

1928 births
2017 deaths
People from Giżycko County
People from East Prussia
20th-century German journalists
German music journalists
German literary critics
German music critics
German music historians
20th-century German musicologists
21st-century German musicologists
German theatre critics
German columnists
Germanists
Officers Crosses of the Order of Merit of the Federal Republic of Germany
Echo (music award) winners